Belarus competed at the 2014 Winter Olympics in Sochi, Russia, from 7 to 23 February 2014. Belarus' team consisted of 26 athletes, competing in five sports.

With five gold medals won this was Belarus' most successful Winter Olympics. The five gold medals was also the most won by the country at any Olympics since independence.

Competitors

Medalists

Alpine skiing 

According to the final quota allocation released on 20 January 2014, Belarus had two athletes in qualification position.

Biathlon 

Based on their performance at the 2012 and 2013 Biathlon World Championships, Belarus qualified 5 men and 5 women.

Men

Women

Mixed

Cross-country skiing 

According to final quota allocation released on 20 January 2014, Belarus had five athletes in qualification position.

Distance
Men

Women

Sprint

Freestyle skiing 

According to the final quota allocation released on 20 January 2014, Belarus had six athletes in qualification position. The full list of Belarusian freestyle skiing team was officially announced on 22 January 2014.

Aerials

Short track speed skating 

Based on their performance at World Cup 3 and 4 in November 2013, Belarus qualified 1 man (1500 m) and 1 woman (1500 m). For the first time ever a Belarusian male athlete qualified in the sport.

References

External links 

 
 

Nations at the 2014 Winter Olympics
2014
Winter Olympics